Camp is the debut studio album by American recording artist Donald Glover, under his stage name Childish Gambino. It was released on November 15, 2011, by Glassnote Records. After releasing four mixtapes and three independent albums, Gambino signed a deal to Glassnote, making Camp his first album on a major record label. The album was co-produced in its entirety by Gambino's longtime collaborator Ludwig Göransson.

Camp received generally positive reviews from critics, debuting at number 11 on the US Billboard 200, selling 52,000 copies in the first week.

Background 
On September 6, 2011, Glover signed with Glassnote. The founder Daniel Glass says "There's a tremendous sense of rock'n'roll about him, an irreverence and an authenticity, He fits in with our roster because he's alternative. He liked our approach, which is very touring-intensive. Secondly, it's about how progressive he's been online: inclusive of his fans and very liberal with giving away music. He knows his audience."

In late October, he announced that the album would be released on November 15.

Release and promotion
The album was made available for pre-order on iTunes on November 1, 2011. On the same day, the music video for "Bonfire" was released through Gambino's website and YouTube. The album was made available in its entirety for streaming on NPR on November 6, 2011.

Singles
The album's lead single, "Bonfire", was debuted on Funkmaster Flex's Hot 97 radio show on September 17, 2011. "Heartbeat" was released as the album's second single on November 15, 2011, and reached 18 on the US Bubbling Under Hot 100 Singles.

On July 24, 2012, the music video for the song, "Fire Fly", was released on Vevo. "Fire Fly" was later serviced to British contemporary hit radio on July 30, 2012.

Other songs
On January 9, 2013, Gambino released his latest video from Camp, "L.E.S." The song's title is an acronym for the Lower East Side of the New York City borough of Manhattan, the location of the video shoot. Photographer Ibra Ake directed and filmed the video over "several nights" on the streets of the Lower East Side, in front of places like Pianos, and riding in cabs around the district; but not once does Gambino appear himself. While on tour in the summer of 2012, Gambino played this video in the background while he performed "L.E.S." onstage.

Critical reception

Camp was met with generally positive reviews. At Metacritic, which assigns a normalized rating out of 100 to reviews from mainstream critics, the album received an average score of 69, based on 27 reviews. Aggregator AnyDecentMusic? gave it 6.7 out of 10, based on their assessment of the critical consensus.

Barry Nicolson of NME dubbed it "the hip-hop album of the year" and commended Gambino's "focus on being [...] witty, heartfelt, honest and occasionally uproarious." Steve Lepore of PopMatters found the album to be "undoubtedly one of the best records of any genre to come out in 2011" and characterized it as "a juxtaposition of mostly depressing, self-loathing rap mixed with some of the most enjoyable post-Graduation music." In his consumer guide for MSN Music, Robert Christgau complimented its "choral and orchestral movie music" and stated, "it's less surefire than Culdesac. But it's more satisfying emotionally, because the autobiography reaches deep". Mojo stated, "The identity-crisis themed Camp trumps through whip-smart intelligence, comic brio and bristling malign intent." AllMusic editor David Jeffries commended Gambino for "taking indie hip-hop to new levels" and called the album "remarkable". Evan Rytlewski of The A.V. Club was more critical, stating "Camp is heavy with themes of racial expectations and cultural ostracism—big ideas that aren't always done justice by Glover's cartoonishly exaggerated, one-liner-laden flow."

Mosi Reeves of Spin found the album to be "a bit of a mess. It veers wildly from poignant emotions to maudlin histrionics, often in the same song." Pitchforks Ian Cohen stated, "While Glover's exaggerated, cartoonish flow and overblown pop-rap production would be enough to make Camp one of the most uniquely unlikable rap records of this year (and most others), what's worse is how he uses heavy topics like race, masculinity, relationships, street cred, and 'real hip-hop' as props to construct a false outsider persona." Claire Suddath of Time criticized Gambino for "bragging about all of the girls he's banged" too often, but complimented his "catchy, danceable sound very much akin to that of Kanye West" and stated, "Ultimately, Camp is a skillful album created by a conflicted man ... But if Camp doesn't have a motif maybe that's because [he] doesn't have one either. He acts, he writes, he still does stand-up, and yes, he also raps. Some people can't be put into a box that easily."

Retrospective
In an interview with Interview, Childish Gambino reflected about the album and the reception: "I like parts of that album and I learned so much. Mostly that concept doesn't outshine content. But when they're in equilibrium, it's extremely potent. I don't think I was clear on that album, and the songs weren't catchy enough for me. Made it feel like novelty. Because I wouldn't bop any of the songs in the car now. Maybe a couple of the hooks."

Commercial performance
Camp debuted at number 11 on the US Billboard 200, selling 52,000 copies in the first week. As of November 2013, the album has sold 242,000 copies in the United States according to Nielsen SoundScan.

Track listing
All tracks were written and produced by Childish Gambino (under his real name, Donald Glover) and Ludwig Göransson.

Personnel

 Donald Glover – design, drum programming, producer, programming, string arrangements, vocals
 Ludwig Göransson – drum programming, engineer, guitar, keyboards, producer, programming
 Erik Arvinder – string arrangements, violin
 Bryan Carrigan – engineer
 Thomas Drayton – bass
 Chris Fogel – mixing
 Shepard – drum programming, guitar, producer
 Janet Leon – vocals ("Fire Fly")
 Dean – vocals ("Sunrise")
 Beldina Malaika – vocals ("Not Going Back")
 Ryan McClure – engineer, mixing
 Vlado Meller – mastering
 Questlove – drums
 Whitney Wood – choir, chorus, soloist
 Chris Scully – art direction, layout
 Ibra Ake – photography

Charts

Weekly charts

Year-end charts

Certifications

References

2011 debut albums
Donald Glover albums
Glassnote Records albums
Universal Music Group albums